Off the Dole is a 1935 British film starring George Formby. Formby appeared as John Willie, a stage character originally developed by his father, George Formby, Sr.; Beryl Formby, Formby Jnr's wife, also appeared in the film.

Plot
John Willie has his dole money denied him for moonlighting and not trying to find work. His uncle asks him to take over his detective agency.

Cast
George Formby as John Willie
Beryl Formby as Grace, Charm and Ability
Constance Shotter as Irene
Dan Crisp as The Inimitable Dude
James Plant as Crisp and Debonaire
Stan Pell as The Most Inoffensive Parson
Stan Little as Little Jack
Tully Comber as Measured for his Part
Clifford McLaglen as A Villain and Proud of It
Wally Patch as Revels in his Part

Background/production
Off the Dole cost £3,000 to make, and earned £80,000 at the box office. As with Formy's previous film, Boots! Boots! (1934), the film was in a revue format, and also showed Formby in the role of John Willie; Beryl was his co-star. According to Formby's biographer, the cultural historian Jeffrey Richards, the two films "are an invaluable record of the pre-cinematic Formby at work".

Notes and references
Notes

References

Sources

 

1935 films
1935 comedy films
British comedy films
British black-and-white films
Films shot in Greater Manchester
1930s English-language films
1930s British films